Loris is the common name for the strepsirrhine mammals of the subfamily Lorinae (sometimes spelled Lorisinae) in the family Lorisidae. Loris is one genus in this subfamily and includes the slender lorises, Nycticebus is the genus containing the slow lorises, and Xanthonycticebus is the genus name of the pygmy slow loris.

Description
Lorises are nocturnal and arboreal. They are found in tropical and woodland forests of India, Sri Lanka, and parts of southeast Asia. Loris locomotion is a slow and cautious climbing form of quadrupedalism. Some lorises are almost entirely insectivorous, while others also include fruits, gums, leaves, and slugs in their diet.

Lorises have a special adaptation called a "toothcomb" in their lower front teeth, which they use for grooming their fur and even injecting their venom.

Female lorises practice infant parking, leaving their infants behind in trees or bushes. Before they do this, they bathe their young with allergenic saliva that is acquired by licking patches on the insides of their elbows, which produce a mild toxin that discourages most predators, though orangutans occasionally eat lorises.

Taxonomic classification

The family Lorisidae is found within the infraorder Lemuriformes and superfamily Lorisoidea, along with the family Galagidae, the galagos. This superfamily is a sister taxon of Lemuroidea, the lemurs. Within Lorinae, there are ten species (and several more subspecies) of lorises across three genera:
 Family Lorisidae
 Subfamily Perodicticinae
 Subfamily Lorinae
 Genus Loris
 Gray slender loris, Loris lydekkerianus
 Highland slender loris, L. lydekkerianus grandis
 Mysore slender loris, L. lydekkerianus lydekkerianus
 Malabar slender loris, L. lydekkerianus malabaricus
 Northern Ceylonese slender loris, L. lydekkerianus nordicus
 Red slender loris, L. tardigradus
 Dry Zone slender loris, L. tardigradus tardigradus
 Horton Plains slender loris, L. tardigradus nyctoceboides
 Genus Xanthonycticebus
 Pygmy slow loris, X. pygmaeus
 Genus Nycticebus
 Bangka slow loris, Nycticebus bancanus
 Bengal slow loris, N. bengalensis
 Bornean slow loris, N. borneanus
 Sunda slow loris, N. coucang
 Javan slow loris, N. javanicus
 Kayan River slow loris, N. kayan
 Philippine slow loris, N. menagensis
 Sumatran slow loris, N. hilleri
 †? N. linglom (fossil, Miocene)

References

 
Taxa named by John Edward Gray